Habits of the Heart is the only studio album by Idle Warship, a collaboration between hip-hop artist Talib Kweli and singer Res, released on November 1, 2011.

Critical reception

Habits of the Heart received general acclaim from music critics. Ross Lockhart described the album as being "chock full of craziness" with a "unique blend" of genres and a "high energy" that "never relents". Lockhart lent particular praise to Res, writing that though "Kweli makes a few quality appearances...she steals the show", describing her vocals as "sultry and powerful." Furthermore, Lockhart favorably described the song's "hooks" as "ridiculously catchy" and the vocals "pure listening pleasure". However, he noted that the album "can get a bit fluffy" going on to write that "these tracks wouldn't seem out of place on the soundtrack to an EA sports video game"  Meanwhile, Colorado Daily writer Ashley Dean called the album "phenomenal", citing their "organic" blend of "hip-hop, soul, funk, rock and electro influences" as "an achievement that's especially satisfying". Dean also highlighted "Enemy", describing it as "an intense, Latin-flavored funk number", "Kayta", "Are You In" and "Covered in Fantasy".

Track listing

References 

2011 albums
Albums produced by DJ Khalil
Idle Warship albums